"Sun Is Shining" is a song by Swedish dance music duo Axwell & Ingrosso. The song was released in Sweden on 12 June 2015 as the fourth single from their debut studio album More Than You Know. The song was written by Sebastian Ingrosso, Salem Al Fakir, Axel Hedfors and Vincent Pontare. The song peaked at number 1 on the Swedish Singles Chart.

Music video
A music video to accompany the release of "Sun Is Shining" was first released into YouTube on 12 June 2015 at a total length of four minutes and ten seconds.
The video was shot in Antwerp, Belgium. It shows people finding notes with the song's lyrics written on them, which are revealed to have been created by Axwell and Ingrosso themselves, who also spread the notes across the city by throwing them off roofs of buildings.At the end of the video a vortex sweeps all the notes into the shape of the duo's logo. As of February 2021, it has received more than 138 million views.

Track listing

Commercial usage
The song was used in a 2015 summer swimwear commercial for Swedish clothing company H&M which featured models Adriana Lima, Doutzen Kroes, Natasha Poly, and Joan Smalls.

Charts

Weekly charts

Year-end charts

Certifications

Release history

References

External links

2014 songs
2015 singles
Songs written by Axwell
Songs written by Sebastian Ingrosso
Songs written by Vincent Pontare
Songs written by Salem Al Fakir
Number-one singles in Sweden
Axwell & Ingrosso songs